Alexander Arturovich Rou (also, Rowe, from his Irish father's name) (– 28 December 1973) was a Soviet film director, and People's Artist of the RSFSR (1968). He directed a number of children's fantasy films, based mostly on Russian folklore, that were highly popular and often imitated in the Soviet Union.

Biography
He was born to an Irish father Arthur Rowe, (an engineer, who in 1905 came under contract to Russia to establish flour-milling) hence his unusual (for Russia) family name, and a Greek mother, known as Julia Karageorgia. His father worked in Yuryevets and in 1914 returned to Ireland, leaving the family in unstable Russia.

Starting in 1930, Alexander worked at Mezhrabpomfilm as an assistant director to Yakov Protazanov on the films Marionettes (1934) and Without a Dowry (1937), as well as with other directors. From 1937, he worked at the "Soyuzdetfilm" studio, later known as the Gorky Film Studio. He directed more than 20 fantasy films. Most of them were based on the Russian folklore or Russian fantasy books, such as by Nikolai Gogol, Petr Yershov, and Vitali Gubarev. They were a part of folk revival trend in the Soviet cinema, alongside films by Aleksandr Ptushko, Ivan Ivanov-Vano, Lev Atamanov, and others. Rou's movies were immensely popular in the Soviet Union and set up a tradition of fantasy films that was followed by the younger directors. 

Rou died in 1973 in a Moscow hospital while working on pre-production of his final movie Finist, the brave Falcon. It was completed by Gennady Vasilyev after his death.

Selected filmography
 1938 —  Wish upon a Pike
 1939 —  Vasilisa the Beautiful
 1941 —  The Humpbacked Horse
 1944 —  Kashchey the Immortal
 1953 —  May Nights
 1954 —  The Secret of Mountain Lake
 1958 —  New Adventures of Puss in Boots
 1960 —  The Magic Weaver
 1960 —  Cinderella
 1961 —  The Night Before Christmas
 1963 —  Kingdom of Crooked Mirrors
 1964 —  Jack Frost
 1968 —  Fire, Water, and Brass Pipes
 1969 —  Barbara the Fair with the Silken Hair
 1973 —  The Golden Horns (Baba Yaga)

See also
 Aleksandr Ptushko
 Ivan Ivanov-Vano
 Lev Atamanov

References

External links

1906 births
1973 deaths
People from Sergiyev Posad
Russian people of Irish descent
Russian people of Greek descent
Soviet film directors
Soviet people of Irish descent
Soviet people of Greek descent
Fantasy film directors